Hərtiz (also, Hərtis and Gartiz) is a village in the Qubadli Rayon of Azerbaijan.

Hərtiz is the Azeri village in Qubadli

References 

Populated places in Qubadli District